Afrepipona macrocephala is a species of wasp in the family Vespidae. It was described by Gribodo in 1894.

References

Potter wasps
Insects described in 1894